Howard Oreon Kinsey (December 3, 1899 – July 26, 1966) was an American tennis player in the 1920s.  He was originally from California.

Playing record 

His most significant championships were the 1926 French National men's doubles championship, where he and Vincent Richards beat Henri Cochet and Jacques Brugnon (a pairing who went on to win three other French National doubles titles) in the final, and the 1924 U.S. National men's doubles championship with his brother Robert Kinsey. Bill Tilden wrote of the pair that he had "seldom seen a team work together more smoothly than the Kinseys."  In 1926, he reached the Wimbledon final, losing to Jean Borotra.

Kinsey was ranked world No. 7 in 1924 by A. Wallis Myers in his amateur rankings for The Daily Telegraph. As a pro, American Lawn Tennis Magazine ranked Kinsey as world No. 6 in 1930.

Later in 1926, he went on to be one of the first players signed up by the promoter Charles C. Pyle to play in his professional tennis league.  After a split with Pyle, he joined Richards in forming an association of professional tennis players.

In 1936, he and Helen Wills Moody volleyed a tennis ball back and forth 2,001 times without missing.  The feat took them 1 hour and 18 minutes. They only broke off the exchange so that Kinsey could go teach a lesson that he had scheduled.

Kinsey is a member of the USTA Northern California Hall of Fame.

Grand Slam finals

Singles: (1 runner-up)

Doubles: (2 titles, 1 runner-up)

Mixed Doubles (1 runner-up)

See also 
 Professional Tennis Championships

References

External links
 

American male tennis players
French Championships (tennis) champions
Tennis players from San Francisco
United States National champions (tennis)
1899 births
1966 deaths
Grand Slam (tennis) champions in men's doubles
Professional tennis players before the Open Era